Tanzania competed at the 2020 Summer Olympics in Tokyo. Originally scheduled to take place during the summer of 2020, the Games were postponed to 23 July to 8 August 2021, because of the COVID-19 pandemic. It was the nation's thirteenth consecutive appearance at the Summer Olympics.

Competitors
The following is a list of the number of competitors in the Games.

Athletics

Tanzanian athletes achieved the entry standards, either by qualifying time or by world ranking, in the following track and field events (up to a maximum of 3 athletes in each event):

Track & road events

References

Nations at the 2020 Summer Olympics
2020
2021 in Tanzanian sport